Simo "Sipe" Johannes Santapukki (born 20 December, 1977, Lahti, Finland) is a Finnish musician, best known as the drummer for rock band Apulanta. Santapukki graduated from high school Heinolan Lyseonmäen. He joined Apulanta in 1991 and so has been a member of the band since the early days.

In 2002, Sipe released his eponymous album featuring numerous notable Finnish singers such as Gösta Sundqvist, Tommi Liimatta, Timo Rautiainen and Hannu Sallinen, as well as Sipe's former girlfriend Anna Eriksson.

Santapukki is a big fan of motor sports. In 2004 he won the silver medal in the Finnish Formula 3. Santapukki's art exhibition Narrilaivan kapteeni (Captain of the Ship of fools) was held in Heinola in 2003.

In 2020 Santapukki became a judge on The Voice of Finland alongside bandmate Toni Wirtanen.

Discography
Sipe -CD (2002)
 Tilatkaa tytöt taksi / Häiriintynyt kuu / Kultaiset valheet / Viiksikset / Kuparihaka / Aika jättää / Tänään / Narrilaivan kapteeni / Jalostettua turhamaisuutta / Seurataan johtajaa

Singles
Häiriintynyt kuu (2002)
 Häiriintynyt kuu / Tiiliseinää
Seurataan johtajaa (2002)
 Seurataan johtajaa (radio edit) / Seurataan johtajaa / Ritari Q

References

External links
Sipe @ MySpace

1977 births
Finnish rock drummers
Living people
People from Lahti
21st-century drummers